Beatrice of Castile (1242/1244 – 07 august 1300), an illegitimate daughter of Alfonso X of Castile and his mistress Mayor Guillén de Guzmán, was the second Queen consort of Afonso III of Portugal.

Biographical sketch 
She was probably born shortly before 31 December 1244 when her father, King Alfonso, "with the consent of his father", donated Elche to his daughter Beatrice and all the children that she had with Mayor Guillén de Guzmán.  
As part of his strategy to reach an agreement with the Kingdom of Portugal on the sovereignty of the Algarve, King Alfonso X offered his daughter Beatrice in marriage to King Afonso III of Portugal. The wedding was celebrated in 1253. Under the agreement, the king of Castile promised that we would cede all the rights he held in the Algarve to the first male offspring of Alfonso III and Beatrice when the child was seven years' old. The Portuguese nobility considered this marriage "humiliating for the King of Portugal",. Much more serious was the fact that when the nuptials took place, the Portuguese monarch was still married to Matilda II of Boulogne, who, in 1255, accused her husband before Pope Alexander IV of bigamy. In 1258, the Pope condemned him for adultery, demanded that he return Matilda's dowry, and placed him under interdict. Matilda, however, died that year and the Pope's threats were left in suspense.

Until her husband's death, Beatrice had great influence in the Portuguese court and supported the rapprochement of the kingdoms of Portugal and Castile.

When her mother died no later than 1267, she inherited her estates in La Alcarria which included Cifuentes, Viana de Mondejar, Palazuelos, Salmerón, Valdeolivas and Alcocer. In the last-mentioned city, she took under her protection the Monastery of Santa Clara that her mother, Mayor Guillén de Guzmán, had founded.

Queen Beatrice returned to Seville in 1282 due to discrepancies with her son, King Denis. Before November 1282, already a widow, she showed her monetary and personal support for her father in the dispute with her half-brother Sancho. A charter kept at the Torre do Tombo National Archive in Lisbon documents the donation made by King Alfonso X of Castile to his daughter Beatrice of the villas of Mourão, Serpa, Moura with their castles and, on the same day, he also gave her the Kingdom of Niebla and the royal tithes of the city of Badajoz. She remained at her father's side and was at his deathbed in 1284.

Beatrice died on 27 October 1303 and was buried at the Monastery of Alcobaça.

Marriage and issue 
The bride was about 11 years old and the groom was 42 years old. They had the following children:

Ancestry

Notes

References

Bibliography 
 
 
 
 
 
 
 

1240s births
1303 deaths
Portuguese queens consort
Castilian House of Burgundy
House of Burgundy-Portugal
13th-century Portuguese people
14th-century Portuguese people
13th-century Portuguese women
14th-century Portuguese women
Daughters of kings
Queen mothers